The Waitematā Local Board is one of the 21 local boards of the Auckland Council, and is one of the three boards overseen by the council's Waitematā and Gulf Ward councillor.

The Waitematā board, named after the Waitematā Harbour which forms its northern boundary, covers the Auckland central business district, and the suburbs of Arch Hill, Eden Terrace, Freemans Bay, Grafton, Grey Lynn, Herne Bay, Mechanics Bay, Newmarket, Newton, Parnell, Ponsonby, Saint Marys Bay, Western Springs, and Westmere.

The board is governed by seven board members elected at-large.

Demographics

Waitematā Local Board Area had a population of 82,866 at the 2018 New Zealand census, an increase of 5,730 people (7.4%) since the 2013 census, and an increase of 19,938 people (31.7%) since the 2006 census. There were 34,521 households. There were 41,799 males and 41,070 females, giving a sex ratio of 1.02 males per female. The median age was 31.4 years (compared with 37.4 years nationally), with 7,818 people (9.4%) aged under 15 years, 30,387 (36.7%) aged 15 to 29, 38,118 (46.0%) aged 30 to 64, and 6,543 (7.9%) aged 65 or older.

Ethnicities were 60.3% European/Pākehā, 6.1% Māori, 4.9% Pacific peoples, 31.5% Asian, and 5.7% other ethnicities (totals add to more than 100% since people could identify with multiple ethnicities).

The proportion of people born overseas was 50.7%, compared with 27.1% nationally.

Although some people objected to giving their religion, 54.2% had no religion, 28.4% were Christian, 4.9% were Hindu, 2.4% were Muslim, 2.3% were Buddhist and 3.2% had other religions.

Of those at least 15 years old, 34,839 (46.4%) people had a bachelor or higher degree, and 3,501 (4.7%) people had no formal qualifications. The median income was $39,700, compared with $31,800 nationally. 20,538 people (27.4%) earned over $70,000 compared to 17.2% nationally. The employment status of those at least 15 was that 41,883 (55.8%) people were employed full-time, 11,553 (15.4%) were part-time, and 3,225 (4.3%) were unemployed.

2019–2022 term
The current board members, elected in the 2019 local body elections, in election order:
Alexandra Bonham, City Vision (7547 votes)
Adriana Christie, City Vision (7405 votes)
Sarah Trotman, C&R Communities and Residents (6888 votes) (resigned in 2021, replaced by Glenda Fryer )
Richard Northey, City Vision (6857 votes)
Julie Sandilands, City Vision (6773 votes)
Kerrin Leonie, City Vision (6767 votes)
Graeme Gunthorp, City Vision (6529 votes)

2016-19 term
Board members for this term were originally elected in the 2016 local body elections. The board members, in election order, were:
Pippa Coom, City Vision (8,514 votes)
Rob Thomas, Independent, (8114 votes)
Shale Chambers, City Vision, (7156 votes)
Adriana Christie, City Vision, (6904 votes)
Richard Northey, City Vision, (6338 votes)
Vernon Tava, City Vision, (5740 votes)
Denise Roche, City Vision, (elected in by-election)n1

n1Mark Davey, Auckland Future, (5959 votes), was an original board member but resigned effective 16 October 2017. Denise Roche was elected in a by-election held on 17 February 2018 to fill the vacancy.

2013-16 term
The members elected in the 2013 local body elections, in election order:
Pippa Coom, City Vision (8,228 votes)
Rob Thomas, Independent (7,419 votes)
Shale Chambers, City Vision (6,986 votes)
Greg Moyle, Team Waitemata (6,596 votes)
Christopher Dempsey, City Vision (6,329 votes)
Deborah Yates, City Vision, (5951 votes)
Vernon Tava, City Vision (5,757 votes)

2010-13 term
The first board members, elected in the 2010 local body elections, in election order:
Shale Chambers, City Vision (7,772 votes) 
Pippa Coom, City Vision (7,658 votes) 
Jesse Chalmers, City Vision (7,603 votes) 
Rob Thomas, Independent (6,516 votes) 
Greg Moyle, Citizens & Ratepayers (6,295 votes) 
Tricia Reade, City Vision (5,773 votes) 
Christopher Dempsey, City Vision (5,666 votes)

References

Waitematā Local Board Area
Local boards of the Auckland Region